The Association of University Programs in Health Administration (AUPHA) is a non-profit organization of university-based educational programs, faculty, practitioners, and health care provider organizations.

It works to improve the delivery of health services through the educational of health care administrators. AUPHA also administers Upsilon Phi Delta, the national academic honor society health administration students.

Dan Gentry joined the AUPHA staff in March 2020.

See also 
 William B. Graham Prize for Health Services Research
 Commission on the Accreditation of Healthcare Management Education

External links
Official website

College and university associations and consortia in the United States
Medical and health organizations based in Virginia
Non-profit organizations based in Arlington, Virginia